Grateful is the second studio album by American R&B singer Coko. It was released by Light Records on October 19, 2006. At the 50th Grammy Awards, Coko was nominated for the Grammy Award for Best Contemporary R&B Gospel Album, but lost to Fred Hammond for  Free to Worship.

Reception

Allmusic called Grateful "a blast of high energy testifying and worship. Many of the previous stylistic elements — pop, funk, soul, and urban contemporary — are still intact, but the messages are concerned solely with praising the Almighty, as the songs "Mighty God," "The Reason," and "Holy" attest. Bright, shimmering production complements Coko's elastic, expressive voice on this celebratory release."

Track listing

Charts

References

2006 albums
Coko albums